Wilford Harve Moore (November 20, 1919 – January 21, 2014) was an American football coach. He was the highest winning coach in McMurry Indians football history and had the McMurry football stadium named in his honor.

A native of Littlefield, Texas, Moore earned his physical education degree from Hardin–Simmons University in 1941. He was an assistant coach at Abilene High in the fall of 1941, but joined the United States Army Air Corps on December 9 following the attack on Pearl Harbor.

After returning from World War II, he served as an assistant in 1946 at McMurry and then became the head coach the next year, coaching at McMurry from 1947 to 1954. Moore coached the Indians to a 49–29–5 record and led them to the Oleander Bowl in 1949.

Moore later coached at Lubbock High School, Port Neches-Groves High School and Cleburne High School before returning to Abilene, Texas in 1972 where he lived for the rest of his life.

At Hardin–Simmons, he played alongside Bulldog Turner, who later starred for the Chicago Bears in the National Football League (NFL). At McMurry he coached players like Les Cowan, Brad Rowland and Grant Teaff.

Moore was the only person to be inducted into the athletic halls of fame at both Hardin–Simmons University and McMurry University. Since Moore played for Hardin-Simmons and coached at McMurry, both schools created a trophy named in his honor for the crosstown game.

Head coaching record

College

References

External links
 

1919 births
2014 deaths
American football guards
American football linebackers
Hardin–Simmons Cowboys football players
McMurry War Hawks football coaches
High school football coaches in Texas
United States Army Air Forces personnel of World War II
People from Littlefield, Texas
Players of American football from Texas